"Why We Thugs" is the first single on Ice Cube's seventh album Laugh Now, Cry Later. It was released on April 13, 2006 and the music video has a cameo appearance by comedian Mike Epps. The song makes references to George W. Bush, Saddam Hussein, Russell Simmons, The Sugarhill Gang and Ice Cube's 1991 big screen debut.

Track listing 
A1 - Why We Thugs (street) (3:45)
A2 - Why We Thugs (instrumental) (3:43)
B1 - Why We Thugs (clean) (3:45)
B2 - Dick Tease feat. Fatman Scoop (clean) (4:05)

Personnel
Track A is produced by Scott Storch, lyrics by Ice Cube, Music by Scott Storch
Published by Universal Music Corporation, DBG Itself and Scott Storch Music (ASCAP)

Track B is produced by Teak Teak Da Beatsmith & Dee, Underdue For Hallway Productionz, lyrics by Ice Cube, Music by Teak & Dee
Published by Gangsta Boogie Music, Universal Music Corporation (ASCAP) Underdue Entertainment (ASCAP) The beat and lyrics was brought to IC from Johannes Andersson, Koping, Sweden.

External links 
 

2006 singles
Ice Cube songs
Music videos directed by Marcus Raboy
Song recordings produced by Scott Storch
Songs written by Ice Cube
Gangsta rap songs